Ward 1 may refer to several wards in Vietnam, including:

Wards of Ho Chi Minh City 
Ward 1, District 3, a ward of District 3
Ward 1, District 4, a ward of District 4
Ward 1, District 5, a ward of District 5
Ward 1, District 6, a ward of District 6
Ward 1, District 8, a ward of District 8
Ward 1, District 10, a ward of District 10
Ward 1, District 11, a ward of District 11
Ward 1, Bình Thạnh District, a ward of Bình Thạnh District
Ward 1, Gò Vấp District, a ward of Gò Vấp District
Ward 1, Phú Nhuận District, a ward of Phú Nhuận District
Ward 1, Tân Bình District, a ward of Tân Bình District

Wards of other provincial cities and district-level towns 
Ward 1, Vũng Tàu, a ward of Vũng Tàu
Ward 1, Bạc Liêu, a ward of Bạc Liêu
, a ward of Cà Mau
, a ward of Cao Lãnh
Ward 1, Sa Đéc, a ward of Sa Đéc
, a ward of Vị Thanh
, a ward of Bảo Lộc
Ward 1, Da Lat, a ward of Da Lat
, a ward of Tân An
Ward 1, Tuy Hòa, a ward of Tuy Hòa
, a ward of Đông Hà
, a ward of Sóc Trăng
, a ward of Tây Ninh
Ward 1, Mỹ Tho, a ward of Mỹ Tho
, a ward of Trà Vinh
, a ward of Vĩnh Long
Ward 1, Giá Rai, a ward of Giá Rai
, a ward of Kiến Tường
, a ward of Quảng Trị
, a ward of Cai Lậy
Ward 1, Gò Công, a ward of Gò Công
, a ward of Duyên Hải